Golden is an abandoned mining town located 
at Coyote Creek in Josephine County, Oregon, United States.

History
Wolf Creek was first settled in the late 1840s when gold was discovered. However, most of the settlers left when gold was found in the nearby Salmon River in 1850. The abandoned town was eventually used by Chinese miners, who took over the abandoned mines. Several years later, they were driven out as the previous people living here returned from the Salmon River.

By 1892, over 150 people lived along Coyote Creek. A Campbellite church and general store were constructed, and in 1896 the Golden post office established. In 1915, a stamp mill was built.

In 1920, the post office closed.

The church was rebuilt in 1950. The general store, carriage house, and several homes are still standing today.

The Golden Historic District is listed on the National Register of Historic Places. As of 2011, Golden has become an Oregon State Heritage Site.

The town was featured in the paranormal investigation show Ghost Adventures as the town, especially the church are claimed to be haunted by demonic entities. Several locals shared their experiences of being possessed or feeling disoriented. The attraction Oregon Vortex is also featured.

See also
List of ghost towns in Oregon

References

Former populated places in Josephine County, Oregon
Ghost towns in Oregon
National Register of Historic Places in Josephine County, Oregon
Historic districts on the National Register of Historic Places in Oregon
1896 establishments in Oregon
Populated places established in 1896
Populated places on the National Register of Historic Places